This is a list of notable alumni and staff of Cardiff University and its predecessor institutions

Heads of state and government

Lord Jenkins, former Chancellor of the Exchequer – Home Secretary, President of the European Commission and Chancellor of the University of Oxford (did not graduate)
Barham Salih – president of Iraq, former prime minister of the Iraqi Kurdistan Region and former deputy prime minister of the Iraqi federal government
Faisal Al-Fayez – Prime Minister of Jordan

Politics

David Bahati – State Minister of Finance for Planning in the Cabinet of Uganda
Christine Chapman – MS for Cynon Valley
Jeffrey Cuthbert – Gwent Police and Crime Commissioner, MS for Caerphilly and Welsh Government Minister for Communities and Tackling Poverty
Hefin David – MS for Caerphilly
Wayne David – MP for Caerphilly and UK Shadow Minister for Europe, Shadow Minister for Defence Procurement and Shadow Minister for the Armed Forces
S. O. Davies – miner, trade union official and Labour Party MP
Guto Harri – broadcaster, Communications Director for the Mayor of London
Elin Jones – MS for Ceredigion, Presiding Officer of the National Assembly for Wales and Welsh Government Minister for Rural Affairs
Fatou Sanyang Kinteh – Gambian Minister for Women's Affairs, Children and Social Welfare
Sir Emyr Jones Parry – British Permanent Representative to the United Nations
Glenys Kinnock – MEP and UK Foreign Office Minister
Neil Kinnock – MP for Bedwellty and for Islwyn, Leader of the Labour Party, Leader of the Opposition
Mike Hedges – MS for Swansea East
Hilary Marquand – MP for Cardiff East and Minister for Health.
Robert Minhinnick – co-founder of Friends of the Earth (Cymru)
Christopher Walter Monckton, 3rd Viscount Monckton of Brenchley – advisor to Margaret Thatcher
Craig Oliver – Conservative Party Director of Communications
Adam Price – MS and leader of Plaid Cymru
Bill Rammell – MP for Harlow
David Rees – MS for Aberavon and Deputy Presiding Officer of the Senedd Cymru.
Lord Richards – Chief of the Defence Staff
Michael Shrimpton – barrister, politician, and conspiracy theorist
John Smith – MP for the Vale of Glamorgan, member of the Defence Select Committee
Brian Wilson – MP for Cunninghame North and Minister of State
Mike Wood – MP for Dudley South

University administrators
 C. W. L. Bevan – Principal of the University College of South Wales and Monmounthshire 1966–1972; Principal of University College Cardiff 1972–1987
Leszek Borysiewicz – Vice Chancellor of the University of Cambridge
 David Grant – Vice Chancellor of University of Wales Cardiff 2001–2005; Vice Chancellor of Cardiff University 2005–2012
 Ernest Howard Griffiths – Principal of the University College of South Wales and Monmounthshire 1901–1918
 John Viriamu Jones – Principal of the University College of South Wales and Monmounthshire 1883–1901
 Frederick Rees – Principal of the University College of South Wales and Monmounthshire 1929–1949
 Colin Riordan – Vice Chancellor of Cardiff University since 2012
 Brian Smith – Principal of University of Wales College Cardiff 1988–1996; Vice Chancellor of University of Wales Cardiff 1996–2001
 Anthony Steel – Principal of the University College of South Wales and Monmounthshire 1949–1966
 Sir Aubrey Trotman-Dickenson – Principal of the University of Wales Institute of Science and Technology 1968–1988; Principal of University of Wales College Cardiff 1988–1993

Academics

Abedelnasser Abulrob – medical researcher
Miguel Alcubierre – Mexican theoretical physicist
Rudolf K. Allemann – Swiss biochemist
Gabrielle Allen – computer scientist 
Robin Attfield – philosopher
Martin J. Ball – Emeritus Professor of Linguistics at Bangor University, Cymru/Wales
Paul E. A. Barbier – Professor of French at the University of Leeds
Jason Barker – professor
Yehuda Bauer – Professor of Holocaust Studies at the Avraham Harman Institute of Contemporary Jewry at the Hebrew University of Jerusalem
Archie Cochrane – pioneer of scientific method in medicine
Peter Coles – Professor of Astrophysics
David Crouch – historian
Alun Davies – bioscientist
Huw Dixon – economist
Stephen Dunnett – neuroscientist
Alice Laura Embleton – biologist, zoologist and suffragist.
Martin Evans – Nobel Prize for Medicine 2007
Mahmoud Ezzamel – professorial fellow 
Dimitra Fimi – writer
Brian J. Ford – Honorary fellow of Cardiff University (1986), honorary fellow of the Linnean Society, honorary fellow of the Royal Microscopical Society.
John S. Fossey – Professor of synthetic chemistry at the University of Birmingham
Burt Goldberg – university professor, microbiologist
Karen Holford – engineer
Robert Huber – Professor of Chemistry, Nobel Laureate in Chemistry 1988
John Loughlin – Professor of Politics
Vaughan Lowe – Chichele Professor of Public International Law in the University of Oxford
Ursula Masson – women's history and feminism
Patrick Minford – Professor of Applied Economics
John Warwick Montgomery – American lawyer and theologian; Distinguished Research Professor of Philosophy and Christian Thought at Patrick Henry College
Christopher Norris – literary critic
Keith Peters – Regius Professor of Physic in the University of Cambridge
Leighton Durham Reynolds – Emeritus Professor of Classical Languages and Literature, University of Oxford 
Alice Roberts – clinical anatomist and osteoarchaeologist
Wendy Sadler – physicist and science communicator
H. W. Lloyd Tanner – Professor of Mathematics and Astronomy (1883–1909)
Pamela Taylor – Professor of Forensic Psychiatry since 2004
Meena Upadhyaya – medical geneticist
Keith Ward – philosopher, Gresham Professor of Divinity, Gresham College
Chandra Wickramasinghe – mathematician, astronomer and astrobiologist, Professor of Applied Mathematics 
Rheinallt Nantlais Williams – professor of the philosophy of religion, principal of the United Theological College, Aberystwyth
Emma Yhnell – biomedical research scientist

Business
Spencer Dale – Chief economist, Bank of England
Andrew Gould – chairman and former CEO, Schlumberger
Martin Lewis – personal finance journalist, television presenter and website entrepreneur
Dame Mary Perkins – co-founder, Specsavers
Ceri Powell – senior Royal Dutch Shell executive
John Pettigrew (businessman) – CEO, National Grid plc
Lorenzo Simonelli – CEO, Baker Hughes Company
Terry Smith – British Fund Manager, Fundsmith

Religion
Gregory Cameron – Bishop of St Asaph
Sheila Cameron – lawyer and ecclesiastical judge
Paul Colton – Bishop of Cork, Cloyne and Ross
Dominic Walker – Bishop of Monmouth

Sport
Nathan Cleverly – professional boxer and former WBO light heavyweight world champion
Gareth Davies – former Wales and British and Irish Lions international rugby union player, and current chief executive of Cardiff Rugby Football Club
Gerald Davies – former Wales and British and Irish Lions international rugby union player
Mike Hall – former Wales and British and Irish Lions international rugby union player
Heather Knight – English cricketer
Steven Outerbridge – Bermudian cricketer
Jamie Roberts – Wales and British and Irish Lions international rugby union player
James Tomlinson – English cricketer
Bradley Wadlan – Welsh cricketer
Alex Gough – Squash player

Arts and journalism
Andrew Matthews-Owen (pianist and accompanist, professor at Trinity Laban Conservatoire of Music and Drama, London)

Paul Atherton – television and film producer and director
Matt Barbet – journalist
Manish Bhasin – journalist and television presenter
Nick Broomfield – documentary filmmaker and receiver of the BAFTA Lifetime Achievement Award for Contribution to Documentary
Philip Cashian – composer
Suw Charman-Anderson – journalist and social software consultant.
Adrian Chiles – television presenter
Gillian Clarke – poet and receiver of the Queen's Gold Medal for Poetry
Huw Edwards – journalist
Ken Elias – artist/painter
Max Foster – CNN anchor, CNN Today
M. A. Griffiths – poet
Julia Hartley-Brewer – journalist and television presenter
Jiang Heping – executive director of the CCTV Sports Programming Centre and Controller of CCTV-5
Tim Hetherington – photo-journalist and co-director of Academy Award-nominated Restrepo
Elis James – stand-up comedian and actor
Alun Hoddinott – composer
Sioned James – choral conductor
Karl Jenkins – composer
Alan Johnston – journalist
Riz Khan – journalist and television interviewer
Bernard Knight – crime writer
Simon Lane – co-founder and Creative director of The Yogscast Ltd
Gwilym Lee – actor.
Siân Lloyd – television presenter
Los Campesinos! – six piece indie pop band
Philip Madoc – actor
Paul Moorcraft – writer
Sharon Morgan – actress
Joanna Natasegara – documentary producer, Academy Award winner for Netflix documentary The White Helmets
Siân Phillips – actress
Susanna Reid – television presenter
James Righton – musician
Leo Rowlands – Welsh musical composer, Catholic priest
Arlene Sierra – composer
Mari Strachan – novelist and librarian
Richard Tait – former BBC governor and BBC trustee
Craig Thomas – author
Alex Thomson – journalist & television presenter
Vedhicka – Indian actress
Grace Williams – composer
Ron Smerczak – actor

References